The autostrada A2 in Poland, officially named Autostrada Wolności (Motorway of Freedom), is a motorway which runs from interchange Świecko with national road 29 near the Polish-German border in Świecko/Frankfurt an der Oder (connecting to A12 autobahn), through Poznań and Łódź to Warsaw and, in the future, to the Polish-Belarusian border in Terespol/Brest (connecting to M1 highway). The motorway is a part of the European route E30 connecting Berlin and Moscow.

The motorway between German border and Warsaw was constructed between 2001 and 2012 (the first fragment totalling  was originally built between 1977 and 1988 and renovated to modern standards during the construction of the remaining sections), and is now complete. Most of the stretch from the border to Łódź is tolled (see Tolls on Polish highways for details).

Eastwards from Warsaw, A2 is being gradually extended. The first  segment of this section was the bypass of Mińsk Mazowiecki, which opened in August 2012. The second  segment between Warsaw and Mińsk Mazowiecki was completed in 2020. The longest section from Mińsk Mazowiecki to Biała Podlaska is in realization (design-build contracts) and is planned to get completed by 2024. The last segment to the Belarusian border is under design, intended to get opened by 2028.

A2 does not formally run through Warsaw itself, instead turning into S2 Expressway (fully completed since December 2021). The motorway also does not technically run to the border with Germany – instead its endpoint is placed near the Świecko interchange ca.  away from the border, although the remaining section is also a dual-carriageway road constructed mostly in motorway standard.

Route

History of construction
The first highway planned along part of this route was a Reichsautobahn initiated by Nazi Germany to connect Berlin with Poznań (Posen). The construction of this highway, accelerated after Poznań was incorporated into Germany following the Invasion of Poland in 1939, was interrupted by the war and never finished, but traces of its earthworks were clearly visible on satellite photographs for decades afterwards, especially between the border with Germany and Nowy Tomyśl. Most of these traces have now disappeared as the modern motorway was built largely following the same route. A short stretch of the uncompleted highway between the border and Rzepin was finished as a dual carriageway road after 1945, in effect forming an extension of the German A 12 highway (opened as a Reichsautobahn in the 1930s). Except for this stretch, the construction work was not continued in the decades after the war.

New plans to build the A2 motorway were seriously formulated in communist Poland in the 1970s, possibly with the goal of completing it in time for the Moscow Olympics in 1980. Because of the economic crisis which hit the country in the late 1970s and continued throughout the 1980s, only a  section from Września to Konin was opened in the 1980s. Construction of another stretch (between Łódź and Warsaw) was started and then abandoned, leaving an interesting ruin informally named Olimpijka, which was in turn demolished around 2010 when building of the motorway resumed.

Intensive construction of the motorway started only in 2001 after the fall of communism in Poland in 1989. This section is a toll road, with the exception of a short stretch through Poznań which serves as that city's bypass (between the interchanges at Głuchowo and Kleszczewo). An additional  section from Konin to Stryków near Łódź was opened on 26 July 2006. A short  bypass of Stryków, consisting of a 2 km (1.2 mi) extension of the A2 and a provisional single carriageway section of the future A1 motorway, was opened in December 2008, to ease the heavy traffic in that town generated when the motorway reached it.

As of the winter of 2009/2010, the plan was to finish the whole section between the border with Germany and Warsaw by the spring of 2012, giving the Polish capital its first motorway connection to the European motorway network in time for the Euro 2012 football championships. That ambitious goal was jeopardised due to various difficulties encountered in finalising the construction contracts and the delays that resulted. The  section from Stryków to Warsaw was to be built in a public-private partnership, but the negotiations between the government and private companies interested in participating collapsed in February 2009 due to disputes over financing terms. It was then decided that this section of the motorway would be built using public funds alone. The new bidding process was started on 27 March, and the contracts for design and construction of the road were signed on 28 September. The section had been divided into 5 parts and so construction work began in 2010. The contractors were required to have the motorway open to traffic in time for Euro 2012. This goal was an ambitious one and ultimately proved challenging, given the possibility of unexpected delays during construction and the fact that the Chinese consortium abandoned the project less than a year later, so that new contractors had to be selected to replace it. The goal was to have this motorway stretch provisionally opened to traffic in time for Euro 2012, even if it is not fully completed, with various restrictions such as a lower speed limit to ensure safety. For a while it was not clear whether even this limited goal would be reached, but the motorway opened to traffic in June 2012 after very intensive construction work in the final few months.

In November 2011, construction of the stretch from the German border to Nowy Tomyśl had been completed. The road was opened to public traffic on 1 December. Toll plazas on this stretch of the highway weren't opened until May 2012 so use of the western section of the A2 was free of charge until then.

In May 2013, the interchange with the S3 (Jordanowo) was opened to traffic. First stretch is between the interchange with the A2 motorway and the Świebodzin North interchange. In June 2013, the S3 was extended further and opened to traffic to reach from the Świebodzin South interchange to the existing stretch of the S3 expressway at Sulechów. In July 2013, the elevated bypass of Świebodzin between the interchanges of Świebodzin North and Świebodzin South fully opened to traffic thus fully extending the S3 from Szczecin to Sulechów.

Guarantee scandal
After COVEC withdrew from completing its construction of the A2, Bank of China was to pay a performance guarantee to the Polish government's roads organization GDDKiA. However, with Export-Import Bank of China, they refused to pay this; only Deutsche Bank honoured its obligations under the court decision.

Plans

The decision finalizing the route of this section was announced in December 2011, the exception having been a short  section of A2 forming the bypass of Mińsk Mazowiecki which was constructed between August 2009 and August 2012. The section between Warsaw and Mińsk Mazowiecki was opened in 2020. The longest section from Mińsk Mazowiecki to Biała Podlaska is in realization (design-build contracts) and is planned to get completed by 2024. The last segment to the Belarusian border is under design, intended to get opened by 2028.

It is worth noting that the A2 motorway doesn't actually run through Warsaw, as the inhabitants of the districts through which it was to pass have successfully blocked its construction. This outcome was somewhat unusual, since the corridor for the motorway has been reserved by the city planners since the 1970s and kept free of construction. Instead, the traffic is rerouted through two express roads (S2 and S8), of lower standard than the originally planned motorway. One of these roads (S2) runs along the originally planned motorway corridor. In the most affected area, the district of Ursynów, the express road runs in a tunnel, built at considerable expense.

Route description

See also
European route E30

References

External links

Official page of the toll company 
Page about the planned road network through Warsaw  
Poland: The Chinese Motorway – news video from European Journal

Proposed roads in Poland
Motorways in Poland
Constituent roads of European route E30